Sergey Gavrilovich Simonov (Russian: Сергей Гаврилович Симонов; 9 April 1894 – 6 May 1986) was a soviet weapons designer; he is considered one of the fathers of the modern assault rifle.

Mostly known for the Samozaryadnyi karabin sistemi Simonova (Russian: Самозарядный карабин системы Симонова), 1945 (Self-loading Carbine, Simonov's system, 1945), or SKS carbine, he also pioneered the assault and semi-automatic rifle field in the 1920s and 1930s, mostly under the supervision of both Vladimir Fyodorov and Fedor Tokarev. His early work preceded both the M1 Garand (of 1933), and the later M1 Carbine, AK-47, and M16 series.

Born in 1894 in Fedotovo, Simonov began work in a foundry immediately after completing his elementary school studies. By the end of World War I, after completing a basic technician's course of instruction, he began working on a pioneering automatic rifle designed by Vladimir Grigoryevich Fyodorov, the Federov Avtomat. After the Russian Revolution, Simonov continued further at the Moscow Polytechnic Institute, graduating in 1924 to work at Russia's giant Tula Arsenal. By 1926 he had become a quality-control inspector at Tula, and by 1927, had been promoted into the Soviet Design and Development Department where he worked directly under Fyodorov. The Simonov AVS-36, which entered service in the 1930s would see service in the early part of World War II, up to about 1940 or so where it was replaced by other semi-automatic designs.

During World War II, Simonov designed some firearms of his own; a submachine gun which did not enter production, and a self-loading anti-tank rifle, the 14.5×114mm PTRS, which went on to form the basis — in scaled-down form - of the SKS. An earlier semi-automatic rifle, the AVS-36, was hindered by official insistence on using the powerful 7.62×54mmR, which was at that point standard amongst Russian rifles. Unfortunately, as had been demonstrated with the Fedor Tokarev's SVT-40, the rim of the 7.62×54mmR was detrimental to the rapid, reliable function of a semi-automatic rifle.

By 1943, advances in thinking - and confirmed data showed engagements took place between 100 meters to 300 meters — led to the adoption of a shorter, less powerful round, the 7.62×39mm M1943 (also known as "7.62 Soviet" or "7.62 short" to differentiate it from several other rounds in 7.62 mm calibre). Field trials of the new rifle proved the weapon and, in 1944 a pre-production run of the SKS went to the Belorussian Offensive for battlefield trials. After some tweaking, it was officially adopted and designated the 7.62 Samozaryadnyi Karabin Sistemy Simonova Obrazets 1945 g. (translated, "7.62 Self-loading Carbine System Simonov model year 1945") or SKS-45, and chosen as the ideal replacement for the SVT-40.

Projects
AG-043
AVS-36
AKS-53
AKS-91
AO-35 assault rifle
AO-63 assault rifle

Honours and awards
 Hero of Socialist Labour (1954)
 Three Orders of Lenin
 Order of the October Revolution
 Order of Kutuzov, 2nd class
 Order of the Red Star
 Order of the Patriotic War, 1st class
 Order of the Red Banner of Labour, twice
 Honoured Inventor of the RSFSR (1964)
 Medal "In commemoration of the 100th anniversary of the birth of Vladimir Ilyich Lenin"
 Stalin Prize, twice (1942 and 1949)

References

External links

Sergei Gavrilovich Simonov

1894 births
1986 deaths
People from Vladimir Oblast
Firearm designers
Soviet inventors
Soviet engineers
Heroes of Socialist Labour
Recipients of the Order of Lenin
Recipients of the Order of Kutuzov, 2nd class
Stalin Prize winners